Various third-party lens manufacturers have released the following lenses for Sony E-mount cameras since 2010. They are also compatible with Hasselblad E-mount cameras.

Autofocus, electronic aperture

APS-C E-mount lenses

Prime lenses

Zoom lenses

Full-frame E-mount lenses

Prime lenses

Zoom lenses

Manual focus, electronic aperture reporting 
The following lenses have either manually or electronically actuated apertures and can report the aperture value and focal length for inclusion in Exif data and SteadyShot calculations.

Full-frame E-mount lenses 

 Meike
 85mm f/1.8 (no aperture ring)
 Tokina
 FíRIN 20mm F/2.0 FE MF
Viltrox
PFU RBMH 85mm f/1.8 (no aperture ring)
 Voigtländer
 10mm f/5.6 Hyper-Wide-Heliar (announced 2015-10)
 12mm f/5.6 Ultra-Wide-Heliar (announced 2015-10)
 15mm f/4.5 Super-Wide-Heliar (announced 2015-10)
 21mm f/1.4 Nokton E
 21mm f/3.5 Color Skopar E
 35mm f/1.4 Classic Nokton (announced 2017-02)
35mm f/2.0 APO-Lanthar Aspherical (announced 2021-02)
 40mm f/2.8 Heliar
 40mm f/1.2 Nokton (announced 2017-02)
50mm f/1.2 Nokton Aspherical (announced 2019-04)
 65mm f/2.0 Macro APO-Lanthar (announced 2017-02)
 Macro APO-Lanthar 110mm f/2.5
 Zeiss
 Loxia Distagon T* 2.8/21mm (announced 2015-10)
 Loxia Distagon 2.4/25 (announced 2018-02)
 Loxia Biogon T* 2/35mm (announced 2014-09)
 Loxia Planar T* 2/50mm (announced 2014-09)
 Loxia Sonnar T* 2.4/85mm (announced 2016-09)

Fully manual, no electronics

APS-C E-mount lenses 
 7artisans
 Photo lens
 4mm f/2.8 circular fisheye 
 7.5mm f/2.8 ultra-wide angle fisheye 
 12mm f/2.8 
 12mm f/2.8 II
 18mm f/6.3 
 25mm f/0.95 Firefly Series 
 25mm f/1.8 
 35mm f/0.95 Firefly Series 
 35mm f/1.2 
 35mm f/1.2 II
 35mm f/1.4 
 35mm f/2.0 
 50mm f/0.95 Firefly Series 
 50mm f/1.8 
 55mm f/1.4 
 55mm f/1.4 II 
 60mm f/2.8 Macro 
 60mm f/2.8 II Macro 
 Cine lens
 12mm T2.9 Vision Series 
 25mm T1.05 Vision Series 
 35mm T1.05 Vision Series 
 50mm T1.05 Vision Series 
Digital King
 12mm f/7.4 Fisheye
 Fujifilm
 FUJINON MK 18-55mm T2.9
 FUJINON MK 50-135mm T2.9
 HandeVision
 Ibelux 40mm f/0.85
Holga
HPL-SN pinhole lens, 0.25mm aperture size
HL(W)-SN 25mm f/8 fixed aperture
HLT-SN special lens with 18 effects
 Lensbaby
 5.8mm f/3.5 CIRCULAR FISHEYE
 Composer Pro II 50mm f/3.2
 Kamlan
 Kamlan 8mm f/3.0 fisheye lens
 Kamlan 21mm f/1.8
 Kamlan 28mm f/1.4
Kamlan 32mm f/1.1 (announced 2020-02)
 Kamlan 50mm f/1.1 (announced 2017-06)
 Kamlan 50mm f/1.1 Mark 2 (released 2019-06)
 Meike
 6-11mm f/3.5 fisheye zoom
 6.5mm f/2 circular fisheye
 10mm f/2.0
 12mm f/2.0
 12mm f/2.8
 25mm f/0.95
 25mm f/1.8
 25mm f/2
 25mm T2.2 cine
 28mm f/2.8 pancake
 35mm f/1.4
 35mm f/1.7
 50mm 0.95
 50mm f/2.0
 Neewer
 25mm f/0.95
 25mm f/1.8
 28mm f/2.8
 32mm f/1.6
 35mm f/1.2
 35mm f/1.7
 50mm f/2.0
Pergear
 Pergear 25mm f/1.8
Pergear 35mm f/1.6
Pergear 50mm f/1.8
 Photex
 MC 50mm f/2 Tilt-Shift
 Samyang Optics / Rokinon
 Cine Lens
 8mm T3.1 Cine UMC FISH-EYE II Cine Lens
 8mm T3.8 VDSLR UMC Fish-eye CS II Cine Lens
 10mm T3.1 VDSLR ED AS NCS CS II Cine Lens
 12mm T2.2 Cine NCS CS Cine Lens
 16mm T2.2 VDSLR ED AS UMC CS II Cine Lens
 21mm T1.5 ED AS UMC CS Cine Lens
 35mm T1.3 AS UMC CS Cine Lens
 50mm T1.3 AS UMC CS Cine Lens
 Photo Lens
 8mm f/2.8 UMC Fisheye
 8mm f/2.8 UMC Fish-eye II
 8mm f/3.5 Fisheye CS VG10
 8mm f/3.5 UMC Fish-Eye CS II
 10mm f/2.8 ED AS NCS CS
 12mm f/2.0 NCS CS
 16mm f/2.0
 21mm f/1.4
 35mm f/1.2
 50mm f/1.2 AS UMC CS
 85mm f/1.8 ED UMC CS
 100mm f/2.0 ED UMC Macro
 135mm f/2.0
 300mm f/6.3 ED UMC CS mirror lens
 Shenyang Zhongyi Mitakon
 Freewalker 24mm f/1.7
 Speedmaster 35mm f/0.95
SIRUI
Cine Lens
24mm F2.8 Anamorphic 1.33X (2020-12)
35mm F1.8 Anamorphic 1.33X (2020-05)
50mm F1.8 Anamorphic 1.33X (2020-02)
75mm F1.8 Anamorphic 1.33X (2021-05)
 SLR Magic
 CINE 12mm F2.8
 HyperPrime 23mm F1.7 (Announced for Feb 2013)
 HyperPrime CINE 35mm T0.95
 HyperPrime CINE II 35mm f/1.4
 HyperPrime 50mm F0.95
Tokina
SZ 8mm F2.8 E FISH-EYE
SZ 33mm F1.2 E
Venus Optics
Laowa 4mm f/2.8 Fisheye (announced 2018-04)
Laowa 9mm f/2.8 Zero-D (announced 2018-03)
Laowa 10mm f/4 Cookie (announced 2022-07)
Laowa Argus 25mm f/0.95 CF APO (announced 2022-10)
Laowa Argus 33mm f/0.95 CF APO (announced 2020-03)
Laowa 65mm f/2.8 2x Ultra Macro APO (announced 2020-01)
Veydra
 Cine Lens
 Veydra 25mm T2.2
 Veydra 35mm T2.2
 Veydra 50mm T2.2
Viltrox
 Cine lens
 S 23mm T1.5 E 
 S 33mm T1.5 E 
 S 56mm T1.5 E 
 Yasuhara
 Nanoha 4x-5x macro lens with built-in LED light ("Nanohax5(E)")
 MADOKA180(E) 7.3mm f/4.0 (circular fisheye)
 MOMO 28mm f/6.4 Soft focus lens
 Zonlai
 Zonlai 14mm f/2
 Zonlai 22mm f/1.8
 Zonlai 25mm f/1.8
 Zonlai 35mm f/1.6
 Zonlai 35mm f/1.8
 Zonlai 50mm f/1.4

Full-frame E-mount lenses 

 7artisans
 Photo lens
 10mm f/2.8 
 35mm f/5.6 (Aviation edition) lens
 35mm f/1.4 II
 50mm f/1.05
 Cine lens
 35mm T2.0 Spectrum Series
 50mm T2.0 Spectrum Series
 85mm T2.0 Spectrum Series 

Arax
 50mm f/2.0 Tilt Shift lens
Artboard
Funleader 18mm f/8 LensCap
AstrHori
50mm f/1.4 50mm F1.4 Tilt Lens 
DZOptics
Kerlee 35mm f/1.2
Entaniya
Entaniya Fisheye HAL200 (200° FOV)
Entaniya Fisheye HAL250 (250° FOV)
 Handevision
 Iberit 24mm f/2.4
 Iberit 35mm f/2.4
 Iberit 50mm f/2.4
 Iberit 75mm f/2.4
 Iberit 90mm f/2.4
 Lensbaby
 28mm f/3.5 TRIO 28
35mm f/3.5 COMPOSER PRO II WITH EDGE 35 OPTIC
35mm f/3.5 EDGE 35 OPTIC
35mm f/2.8 BURNSIDE 35
35mm f/2.5 COMPOSER PRO II WITH SWEET 35 OPTIC
45mm f/3.5 SOL 45
50mm f/2.5 COMPOSER PRO II WITH SWEET 50 OPTIC
50mm f/3.2 COMPOSER PRO II WITH EDGE 50 OPTIC
 56mm f/1.6VELVET 56
 60mm f/2.5 TWIST 60
 85mm f/1.8 VELVET 85
Meike
 6-11mm f/3.5 zoom circular fisheye
 8mm f/3.5 fisheye
 50mm f/1.2
 50mm f/1.7
 85mm f/1.8
 85mm f/2.8 macro
Meyer-Optik-Görlitz
 Lydith 30 f/3.5
 Lydith 30 f/3.5 II
 Trioplan 35+ f/2.8
 Trioplan 50 f/2.9
 Trioplan 50 f/2.8 II
 Primoplan 58 f/1.9
 Primoplan 58 f/1.9 II
 Primoplan 75 f/1.9
 Primoplan 75 f/1.9 II
 Trioplan 100mm f/2.8
 Trioplan 100 f/2.8 II
 Samyang Optics / Rokinon
 Cine Lens
 12mm T3.1 VDSLR ED AS NCS FISH-EYE Cine Lens
 14mm T3.1 Cine Lens
 14mm T3.1 VDSLR ED AS IF UMC II Cine Lens
 16mm T2.6 ED AS UMC Cine Lens
 20mm T1.9 ED AS UMC Cine Lens
 24mm T1.5 Cine Lens
 24mm T1.5 VDSLR ED AS IF UMC II Cine Lens
 35mm T1.5 Cine Lens
 35mm T1.5 VDSLR AS UMC II Cine Lens
 50mm T1.5 VDSLR AS UMC Cine Lens
 85mm T1.5 Cine Lens
 85mm T1.5 VDSLR AS IF UMC II Cine Lens
 100mm T3.1 VDSLR ED UMC MACRO Cine Lens
 135mm T2.2 Cine Lens
 Photo Lens
 12mm f/2.8 UMC Fisheye
 14mm f/2.8 UMC
 20mm f/1.8 ED AS UMC
 24mm f/1.4 UMC
 Tilt-Shift 24mm f/3.5 UMC
 35mm f/1.4 UMC
 50mm f/1.4 UMC
 85mm f/1.4 Aspherical IF
 Macro 100mm f/2.8 UMC
 135mm f/2.0 UMC
 Shenyang Zhongyi Mitakon
 Mitakon Creator 20mm f/2 macro 4.5x to 4x
 Mitakon Creator 35mm f/2
 Speedmaster 50 mm f/0.95
 Mitakon Creator 85mm f/2
 Speedmaster 135mm f/1.4
SIRUI
Cine Lens
 35mm T2.9 Anamorphic FF1.6X
50mm T2.9 Anamorphic FF1.6X
75mm T2.9 Anamorphic FF1.6X
100mm T2.9 Anamorphic FF1.6X
SLR Magic
 Cine Lens (T-stops)
 15mm T3.5 MicroPrime CINE Lens 
 18mm T2.8 MicroPrime CINE Lens 
 21mm T1.6 MicroPrime CINE Lens 
 25mm T1.5 MicroPrime CINE Lens
 35mm T1.3 MicroPrime CINE Lens
 50mm T1.2 MicroPrime CINE Lens
 75mm T1.5 MicroPrime CINE Lens
 Cine Lens (f-stops)
 18mm f/2.8 Cine Lens
 21mm f/1.5 Cine Lens 
 25mm f/1.4 Cine Lens
 35mm f/1.2 Cine Lens
 50mm f/1.1 Cine Lens
 75mm f/1.4 Cine Lens
 Photo Lens
 35mm f/1.7 Lens
Thingyfy
Pinhole Pro S 11mm (pinhole lens) (0.14mm aperture) 
Pinhole Pro S 26mm (0.1-0.8mm aperture)
Pinhole Pro X 18-36mm (F160-240)
Venus Optics
Laowa 9mm f/5.6 FF RL (announced 2020-06) 
Laowa 11mm f/4.5 FF RL (announced 2020-08)
Laowa 12mm f/2.8 Zero-D (announced 2016-07)
Laowa 14mm f/4 FF RL Zero-D (announced 2020-09)
Laowa 15mm f/2 Zero-D (formerly "D-Dreamer") (announced 2016-09)
Laowa Argus 35mm f/0.95 FF (announced 2021-01)
Laowa Argus 45mm f/0.95 FF (announced 2021-01)
Laowa 105mm f/2 Smooth Trans Focus (announced 2016-03)
Shift
Laowa 15mm f/4.5 Zero-D Shift (announced 2020-10)
Laowa 20mm f/4 Zero-D Shift (announced 2022-03)
 Macro
Laowa 15mm f/4 Wide Angle 1:1 Macro (announced 2015-06)
Laowa 24mm f/14 2X Macro Probe (2018-08)
Laowa 24mm T14 2x PeriProbe (announced 2022-05)
Laowa 25mm f/2.8 2.5-5X Ultra Macro (announced 2018-03)
Laowa 58mm f/2.8 2X Ultra-Macro APO (announced 2022-09)
Laowa 60mm f/2.8 2X Ultra-Macro (2015)
Laowa 85mm f/5.6 2x Ultra Macro APO (announced 2021-11)
Laowa 90mm f/2.8 2x Ultra Macro APO (announced 2022-06)
Laowa 100mm f/2.8 2x Ultra Macro APO (announced 2018-04)
Zoom
Laowa 10-18mm f/4.5-5.6 FE Zoom (announced 2018-04)
Laowa 12-24mm f/5.6 Zoom (formerly "FF II 12-24mm f/5.6 C-Dreamer Ultra-Wide Zoom") (announced 2021-03)
Viltrox
 PFU RBMH 20mm f/1.8 Aspherical
S 20mm T2.0 Aspherical Cinematic
Yasuhara
 Anthy 35mm f/1.8
Zeiss
 Distagon T* Compact Prime CP.2 15 mm/T2.9
 Distagon T* Compact Prime CP.2 Super Speed 35 mm/T1.5
 Planar T* Compact Prime CP.2 Super Speed 50 mm/T1.5
 Planar T* Compact Prime CP.2 Super Speed 85 mm/T1.5
 Sonnar T* Compact Prime CP.2 135 mm/T2.1
 T* Compact Zoom CZ.2 70–200 mm/T2.9
Zenit
Zenitar 50mm f/0.95
 Zunow
 Super Wide Angle SWV-E11-16 11-16mm f/2.8 Cine Lens

See also
 List of Sony E-mount lenses
 List of Minolta A-mount lenses

References